The Chinese Professional Baseball League (CPBL) playoffs included the three top teams from the regular season and saw Uni-President Lions crowned as the champion with the Taiwan Series through the month of October, 2007.  The winner represented Taiwan in the Konami Cup in Japan with the champions from Japan, South Korea, and an allstar team from China to determine an Asian champion in November.

Participants

First Seed - La New Bears - Winner of the second half of the season.  It is their second appearance in the playoff, and the second consecutive appearance. They defeated the Lions in last season's Taiwan Series four games to zero.
Second Seed - Macoto Cobras - Winners of the first half of the season.  It is their second appearance; the last time was 2005, in which they defeated the Lions three games to one, but were defeated by Sinon Bulls four games to zero.
Third Seed - Uni-President Lions - Wildcard winner by placing first in the overall standing of the season. It is their 11th appearance in the playoffs, and the fourth consecutive appearance since the 2004 season. They were defeated by Sinon Bulls four games to three in 2004 Taiwan Series, eliminated by Macoto Cobras three games to one in 2005 playoffs, and defeated by La New Bears four games to zero in 2006 Taiwan Series.

Rules
All participating teams are allowed to register 28 players on their roster, contrary to 25 in the regular season. The winner of first round is allowed to change its roster before advancing to Taiwan Series. There will be no tie games, meaning the game would continue if a winner could not be decided. All other aspects that are not described above would be the same as the rules in regular season.

First round
In the first round of competition, the Uni-President Lions defeated the Macoto Cobras in 3 games to 0, going on to the Taiwan Series.

Game 1, October 12
Hsinjuang Baseball Stadium, Hsinchuang, Taipei County

WP: Nelson Figueroa (1-0) LP: Chang Hsien-chih (張賢智) (0-1)
HRs: Uni-President - Tilson Brito (1); Macoto - Teng Shi-yang (鄧蒔陽) (1), Huang Shi-hao (黃仕豪) (1)
MVP of the Game: Nelson Figueroa (SP) (8.0IP, 6H, 8K, 2BB, 2ER)
Attendance: 2,287

Game 2, October 13
Hsinjuang Baseball Stadium, Hsinchuang, Taipei County

WP: Pete Munro (1-0) LP: Hsu Chu-chien (許竹見) (0-1)
HRs: Uni-President - Tilson Brito (2)
MVP of the Game: Tilson Brito (3B) (5-2, 1HR, 2R, 4RBI)
Attendance: 4,293

Game 3, October 14
Tainan Municipal Baseball Stadium, Tainan City

WP: Pan Wei-lun (潘威倫) (1-0) LP: Andy Van Hekken (0-1)
HRs: Macoto - Hsieh Chia-hsien (謝佳賢) (1); Uni-President - Kao Kuo-ching (高國慶) (1), Chen Lien-hung (陳連宏) (1), Kuo Dai-chi (郭岱琦) (1)
MVP of the Game: Kao Kuo-ching (高國慶) (1B) (4-3, 1HR, 2R, 5RBI)
Attendance: 4,081

Taiwan Series
In the 2007 Taiwan Series, the Uni-President Lions defeated the La New Bears in 4 games to 3.

Awards:
Taiwan Series MVP: Nelson Figueroa (SP) (3-0, 23.0 IP, 21H, 3BB, 25K, 4ER)
Outstanding Player Award: Uni-President - Liu Fu-hao (劉芙豪); La New - Chen Chin-feng (陳金鋒)
Manager of the Year: Lu Wen-sheng (呂文生)

Game 1, October 20
Chengching Lake Baseball Field, Niaosong, Kaohsiung County

WP: Nelson Figueroa (1-0) LP: Huang Chun-chung (黃俊中) (0-1)
HRs: Uni-President - Kuo Dai-chi (郭岱琦) (1); La New - Kit Pellow (1)
MVP of the Game: Yang Sung-hsien (楊松弦) (CF) (4-3, 1R, 3RBI)
Attendance: 11,334

Game 2, October 21
Chengching Lake Baseball Field, Niaosong, Kaohsiung County

WP: Pete Munro (1-0) LP: Hsu Yu-wei (徐余偉) (0-1) SV: Tseng Yi-cheng (曾翊誠) (1)
HRs: Uni-President - Pan Wu-hsiung (潘武雄) (1) (2), Kuo Dai-chi (郭岱琦) (2); La New - Chen Chin-Feng (陳金鋒) (1)
MVP of the Game: Pan Wu-hsiung (潘武雄) (CF) (5-4, 2HR, 2R, 5RBI)
Attendance: 8,864

Game 3, October 23
Tainan Municipal Baseball Stadium, Tainan

WP: Andrew Lorraine (1-0) LP: Pan Wei-lun (潘威倫) (0-1) SV: Mac Suzuki (1)
HRs: La New - Chiang Chih-Tsung (蔣智聰) (1); Uni-President - Liu Fu-hao (劉芙豪) (1)
MVP of the Game: Chiang Chih-Tsung (2B) (5-3, 2H, 1R, 3RBI)
Attendance: 5,263

Game 4, October 24
Tainan Municipal Baseball Stadium, Tainan

WP: Nelson Figueroa (2-0) LP: Hsu Wen-hsiung (許文雄) (0-1)
HRs: La New - Kit Pellow (2); Uni-President - Kao Kuo-ching (高國慶) (1)
MVP of the Game: Nelson Figueroa (SP) (7.0 IP, 9H, 9K, 1BB, 1ER)
Attendance: 7,063

Game 5, October 25
Tainan Municipal Baseball Stadium, Tainan

WP: Mac Suzuki (1-0) LP: Tseng Yi-cheng(曾翊誠) (0-1)
HRs: La New - Huang Lung-Yi (黃龍義) (1), Tsai Chien-Wei (蔡建偉) (1), Lin Chih-Sheng (林智勝) (1), Chen Chin-Feng (陳金鋒) (2); Uni-President - Liu Fu-hao (劉芙豪) (2), Yang Po-chaio (楊博超) (1)
MVP of the Game: Mac Suzuki (RP) (5.1 IP, 7H, 6K, 2BB, 2ER)
Attendance: 10,056

Game 6, October 27
Chengching Lake Baseball Field, Niaosong, Kaohsiung County

WP: Hau Yu-wei (徐余偉) (1-1) LP: Pan Wei-lun (潘威倫) (0-2) SV: Hsu Wen-hsiung (許文雄) (1)
HRs: Uni-President - Liu Fu-hao (劉芙豪) (3), Tilson Brito (1) (2); La New -  Chen Chin-feng (陳金鋒) (3) (4)
MVP of the Game: Chen Chin-feng (陳金鋒) (DH) (4-2, 2HR, 5RBI, 2R)
Attendance: 18,656

Game 7, October 28
Chengching Lake Baseball Field, Niaosong, Kaohsiung County

WP: Nelson Figueroa (3-0) LP: Andrew Lorraine (1-1)
HRs: La New - Lin Chih-Sheng (林智勝) (2)
MVP of the Game: Nelson Figueroa (SP) (9.0 IP, 5H, 1HR, 8K, 1BB, 2ER)
Attendance: 20,000

External links

 CPBL website

CPBL playoffs
Chinese Professional Baseball League playoffs